El Kseur District (القصر   منطقة ايل) is a district of Béjaïa Province, Algeria, and the region of Kabylie. Its capital is located in the town of El Kseur. The district abuts the Mediterranean Sea to the north.

The dïstrict includes the three communes 
 El Kseur, 
Ifenain Ilmathen
Toudja.

References

Districts of Béjaïa Province